Bregovo is a village in Kirkovo Municipality, Kardzhali Province, North West Bulgaria.

References

Villages in Kardzhali Province